Prionapteryx plumbealis is a moth in the family Crambidae. It is found in Namibia and Zimbabwe.

References

Ancylolomiini
Moths described in 1919